Down Below is the fourth studio album by Swedish heavy metal band Tribulation. The album was released January 26, 2018 via Century Media Records. The band released a video for the song “The Lament”.

Reception

Accolades

Music

According to Loudwire, the album "showcases how adept Tribulation are at tempering moods and incorporating different influences (goth rock, traditional metal, death metal, black metal) to craft something entirely unique in a metallic world obsessed with aimless genre-mashing. What helps propel their ethereal sound even in their heaviest moments (such as the earth-cracking Subterannea, Lacrimosa) is the interplay of guitarists Adam Zaars and Jonathan Hultén. When the rhythm riffing sustains, the melodies interject, leaving Tribulation with the ability to dip back into their early roots without ever losing sight on the present."

Track listing
 "The Lament" - 5:39
 "Nightbound" - 5:29
 "Lady Death" - 3:24
 "Subterranea" - 5:24
 "Purgatorio" - 3:40
 "Cries from the Underworld" - 5:11
 "Lacrimosa" - 6:31
 "The World" - 3:55
 "Here Be Dragons" - 7:27
 "Come, Become, To Be" (bonus track) - 3:41

Personnel
Johannes Andersson - bass, vocals
Jonathan Hultén - lead guitar
Adam Zaars - rhythm guitar
Oscar Leander - drums

Charts

References

External links

2018 albums
Tribulation (band) albums
Century Media Records albums